Malak Sechko Cove is the 1.8 km wide cove indenting for 760 m the northwest coast of Guangzhou Peninsula on Nelson Island in the South Shetland Islands, Antarctica north of Harmony Point. The area was visited by early 19th century sealers.

The feature is named after the Bulgarian mythical figure Malak (little) Sechko associated with winter and cold, in relation to working in the harsh Antarctic environment.

Location
British mapping of the area in 1968.

Maps
 Livingston Island to King George Island. Scale 1:200000. Admiralty Nautical Chart 1776. Taunton: UK Hydrographic Office, 1968
 South Shetland Islands. Scale 1:200000 topographic map No. 3373. DOS 610 - W 62 58. Tolworth, UK, 1968
 Isla Nelson - Punta Armonía. Shetland del Sur. Escala 1:5000. Servicio Geográfico Militar del Uruguay, 1986
 Antarctic Digital Database (ADD). Scale 1:250000 topographic map of Antarctica. Scientific Committee on Antarctic Research (SCAR). Since 1993, regularly upgraded and updated

Notes

References
 Bulgarian Antarctic Gazetteer. Antarctic Place-names Commission. (details in Bulgarian, basic data in English)

External links
 Malak Sechko Cove. Adjusted Copernix satellite image

Coves of the South Shetland Islands
Bulgaria and the Antarctic